Harman International Industries, commonly known as Harman (stylized in all-uppercase as HARMAN), is an American audio electronics company. Since 2017, the company has been an independent subsidiary of Samsung Electronics.

Headquartered in Stamford, Connecticut, US, Harman maintains major operations in the Americas, Europe and Asia. Harman markets its products under various brands, including AKG, AMX, Arcam, Bang & Olufsen Automotive, Becker, BSS Audio, Crown, dbx, Harman Kardon, Infinity, JBL, Lexicon, Mark Levinson, Martin, Revel, Soundcraft and Studer.

Early history 
Sidney Harman and Bernard Kardon founded the predecessor to Harman International, Harman Kardon, in 1953.  Both Harman and Kardon were engineers by training and had worked at the Bogen Company, which was a manufacturer of public address systems. They developed high-fidelity audio together. Harman bought out his partner in 1956, and then expanded Harman Kardon into an audio powerhouse, according to a biography written by the Consumer Electronics Hall of Fame.

Acquisitions and expansion 

In the 1960s, Harman Kardon grew larger and acquired other audio houses (such as JBL). In the 1970s, Harman accepted an appointment in the Carter administration as deputy secretary of the Department of Commerce.  When Harman took office in 1976 as head in charge, he sold his company to conglomerate Beatrice Foods to avoid a conflict of interest.  Beatrice promptly sold many portions of the company, including the original Harman Kardon division, and by 1980 only 60% of the original company remained.

After he left his government position in 1978, he created Harman International Industries and reacquired a number of businesses he sold to Beatrice. The company continued its growth plan with a string of acquisitions throughout the 1980s that pushed Harman International's sales from about $80 million in 1981 to more than $200 million by 1986, and then to more than $500 million by 1989. Harman International went public in 1986 with a stock offering on the New York Stock Exchange. Cash from that sale was used to, among many other purchases, buy Soundcraft, a UK producer of professional mixing boards, in 1988 and later – Salt Lake City digital electronics producer DOD Electronics Corp. By 1994, Harman International was selling consumer audio gear under such brands as JBL, Harman Kardon, Infinity and Epicure loudspeakers, as well as professional audio systems with such brands as JBL Professional, UREI, Soundcraft, Allen & Heath, dbx, Studer, DOD, Lexicon, AKG, BSS, Orban, Quested and Turbosound (the last one now under the control of Music Group).

In 2003 Madrigal Audio Laboratories were bought, which includes Highend Mark Levinson and Revel.

In July 2011, Harman acquired MWM Acoustics.

Harman expanded to include lighting in 2013 with the acquisition of Martin Professional.

In June 2014, Harman completed the acquisition of AMX LLC.

In March 2015, Harman acquired the automotive division of Bang & Olufsen for 145 million euros ($156 million) for the unit as well as technology license fees. The purchase didn't include Bang & Olufsen's consumer-electronics business.

In 2015, recognizing the increasing role of software and services in the markets it served, Harman expanded its capabilities around cloud, mobility and analytics with the acquisitions of Symphony Teleca, a software services company based in Mountain View, CA, and Redbend, an Israeli-based provider of software management technology for connected devices, and over-the-air (OTA) software and firmware upgrading services. With these additions, Harman announced the formation of a fourth division, which they called Connected Services.

In March 2016, Harman acquired the automotive cyber-security firm TowerSec. This acquisition increased Harman's competencies in the emerging automotive cyber-security field. This was evidenced by the subsequent launch of the company's '5+1 security framework' incorporating TowerSec's 'ECU shield' technology. This acquisition was notable for further demonstrating Harman's desire to expand beyond its traditional business areas of in-car audio and entertainment systems.

On November 14, 2016, Harman entered into an agreement to be acquired by Samsung.

In February 2017, Harman International shareholders voted in favor of the acquisition by Samsung. On March 10, 2017, the acquisition was completed, with Harman becoming the independent subsidiary of Samsung.

In March 13, 2018  Harman International announced strategic association with Samsung SmartThings, a wholly owned and independent subsidiary of Samsung. 
Through this collaboration, Harman will work with SmartThings to design and develop of the SmartThings app, integrate third-party sensors and drive initiatives for IoT platform hub.

As of early April, 2022 the DOD and DigiTech brands appeared to have been discontinued or sold to another company. Tom Cram, former Product Development Manager, speaking of rumors about him rejoining the company stated, "you need to push those rosy thoughts right out of your heads.” On April 25 2022, Cor-Tek Corporation stated they acquired those brands and their intellectual assets.

Private equity attempt 
Harman International Industries was to delist from NYSE in Q3/2007 due to a buy-out by KKR and Goldman Sachs Capital Partners.  However, as of mid September 2007, KKR announced they would back out of the deal.  On the news, Harman shares plummeted by more than 24%.

Coincident with the buy-out deal, Dinesh Paliwal was hired as company president and CEO in July 2007. On July 1 2008, Sidney Harman was succeeded by Dinesh Paliwal as chairman of the board. In April 2020 he was succeeded by Michael Mauser, who has been working 22 years for Harman.

Brands 

 AIR – a cross-platform runtime system for building desktop applications and mobile applications
 AKG – microphone/headphones
 AMX – video switching and control devices
 Arcam – high end home audio – amplifiers and audio components
 AXYS Tunnel – Amplifier for public tunnel
 Bang & Olufsen Automotive – car audio
 Becker – car infotainment
 BSS Audio – signal processing
 Crown International – pro amplifiers
 dbx – signal processors
 HALOsonic – Noise Management Solutions
 HardWire – guitar pedals
 Harman Kardon – home/car audio
 HiQnet – control network for digital audio equipment, supporting communication over TCP/IP, USB and RS232
 Infinity – home/car speakers/headphones
 JBL – home/car speakers & amplifiers, professional speakers, headphones
 Lexicon – digital processing
 Mark Levinson Audio Systems – home/car audio
 Martin Professional – stage and architectural lighting and effects fixtures
 Revel – home/car speakers
 Selenium – home, car and professional speakers, amplifiers, sound tables/mixers
 S1nn GmbH & Co.
 Soundcraft – mixing consoles
 Studer – mixing consoles, sold to Evertz Microsystems 2021
 Caaresys – in-cabin safety systems

References

External links 

 

 
Manufacturing companies based in Connecticut
Companies based in Stamford, Connecticut
Companies formerly listed on the New York Stock Exchange
American companies established in 1980
Electronics companies established in 1980
American subsidiaries of foreign companies
Samsung Electronics
1980s initial public offerings
2017 mergers and acquisitions